Emm Rock is a conspicuous rock  high, lying  off the south coast of King George Island at the east side of the entrance to Potter Cove, in the South Shetland Islands. This rock, presumably known to early sealers in the area, was sketched by the French Antarctic Expedition, 1908–10, under Jean-Baptiste Charcot, and charted by Discovery Investigations personnel on the Discovery II in 1935. The name derives from the shape of the rock, which resembles the letter M.

References 

Rock formations of King George Island (South Shetland Islands)